The Straube Piano Company (1895–1937) and its successor Straube Pianos Inc. (1937–1949) were American piano manufacturers of uprights, grands, players, and reproducing grands.

The years 1875 to 1932 were a golden age of piano making, a time when pianos had few competitors for home entertainment. Straube manufactured pianos for the last 37 of those years. At the peak in 1909, nearly 364,545 pianos were sold in the United States, according to the National Piano Manufacturers Association. By comparison, in 2011, 41,000 were sold, along with 120,000 digital pianos and 1.1 million keyboards, according to Music Trades magazine. The Straube Piano Company had its own golden era, from about 1904 to 1935, from several perspectives. The company flourished as an innovator of player pianos, rapidly grew into a high-volume producer of premium and affordable pianos, and earned acclaim for its concert grands.

Straube Piano Company developed influential business models based on innovative management, promotion, advertising, and pricing. Its company executives and plant superintendents, particularly E.R. Jacobson (president) and William G. Betz (superintendent and inventor/innovator), were influential industry exponents who held leadership roles in industry organizations. The company produced premium pianos under the Straube name, but also manufactured Hammond, Gilmore, and Woodward brands, some of which sold at lower prices, but were still of high quality. It distributed all models nationally, and its players internationally, particularly in Australia.

History

1890s: early years 
The Straube Piano Company was the outgrowth of Van Matre & Straube (aka Straube & Van Matre), a partnership formalized in February 1895 by Williard Naramore Van Matre, Sr. (1851–1939), and William Straube (né Straub; 1857–1928).

That same month, Van Matre and Straube leased a factory near Chicago at Downers Grove, Illinois, on the Chicago, Burlington and Quincy Railroad, at the present intersection of Warren and Forest Avenues.  The original wareroom was at 24 Adams Street, Chicago.

Straube manufactured its first piano in June 1895 at that factory, which was also the factory of Van Matre & Co. W.N. Van Matre & Co. was a music dealer at 105 State Street in Rockford, Illinois. Around July 1896, Van Matre and Straube dissolved the partnership, after Straube purchased Van Matre's share. Straube continued the business under his own name.

The company's founding year has not been definitively established. In 1907, Straube Piano Company executives publicly recognized 1895 as the founding year. However, in 1911, Alfred Dolge published an influential reference book, Pianos and Their Makers, that gave 1878 as the founding year. The December 19, 1914, issue of Music Trade Review began using the 1878 founding date. At some point, Straube Piano began casting the numerals "1878" in the piano plates (aka iron frames). Straube Piano in 1924 attributed 1879 as the founding year. In 1996, a book author provided 1859 as the founding year.

William Straube (1857–1923), an investor, not a piano expert, incorporated Straube Piano Company in 1897 as an Illinois entity.

James (Jim) Francis Broderick (19 August 1854 Philadelphia – 17 November 1920 Chicago) became president on January 1, 1898, and served in that role until March 1911. Before joining Straube Piano, Broderick had been a traveling salesman for Steger & Company and the B. Shoninger Co.

1900s 
By 1901, William Straube had sold his interest and signed a 5-year non-compete agreement. But in 1901, Straube, his two brothers, Herman Charles Straube (1867–1921) and Martin Straube, Jr. (1869–1934), and an associate, Charles Jacobsen (no relation to the Jacobsons of Straube Piano Company), formed another piano manufacturing company and leased the Club Block in Downers Grove. The Straube Piano Company challenged and won an injunction on December 16, 1901, in Cook County Circuit Court forbidding the Straubes and Jacobsen from using the Straube name in the manufacturing of pianos.

In 1901, Straube Piano Company was one of 31 Chicago-area piano manufacturers that were recognized nationally.

In 1904, the Straube Piano Company moved its manufacturing and executive offices from Chicago to its new custom-built factory in the city of Hammond in Indiana's Calumet Region. Sited on five acres served by the Monon and the Chicago, Cincinnati & Louisville railways, the 3-story facility, with a basement, had 34,000 sq. ft. of factory space. The exterior of the building was  Oehlmacher brick, a light gray brick made in Michigan City, Indiana. The factory was of mill construction. The main structure was 160 by 50 feet, two stories high. The engine house was 50 by 35 feet, detached, and the boiler house was 60 by 45 feet and detached. The Monon dry kiln was 35 by 65 feet and held 20,000 feet of lumber. Equipped with automatic fire doors and fire walls, it had standpipes throughout the structure with separate hose attachments and concrete floors in the basement engine and boiler rooms. At full capacity, the new factory required 200 employees and could produce 3,000 finished pianos a year.

Straube Piano introduced its first player piano in November 1909.

E.R. Jacobson, president 
Ernfrid (Ernest) Reinholdt Jacobson (25 December 1877 Gothenburg, Sweden – 19 June 1976 Chicago) – had begun at Straube in August 1898 as a bookkeeper and stenographer. After initially purchasing a small interest in the company, Jacobson became secretary, and continued to acquire stock from time to time. 

In March 1911, Jacobson purchased the entire interest of the remaining partner and became president. He appointed his brothers as executives: Charles (Carl) Herman Jacobson Thorby (1875–1946), vice-president; and James Frithiof Jacobson (1885–1968), secretary, who all became owners and were actively involved with the further development of the business.

Presto-Times contributor Fred E. Cooper has written that Jacobson took the Straube Piano Company from ordinary piano manufacturer to one of the most successful contenders in the high-quality piano field.

In 1913, construction began on the third addition to the original Straube factory erected in 1904 at 205 Manila Avenue. On January 30, 1930, the Hammond City Council enacted dozens of street name changes – including the change from Manila Avenue to Wildwood Street. The architect was J.T. Hutton (Joseph T. Hutton; 1861–1932) and the contractor was Mahlon Abraham Dickover (1856–1932)

In late 1914 or early 1915, the Straube Piano Company was incorporated in Indiana by the Jacobsons and Thorby with $150,000 capital stock. Around that time, the factory was producing about 12 finished pianos a day, for an annual production worth about three-quarters of a million dollars a year and employed about 150 men for an annual payroll of about $125,000.

Around 1916, the Straube Piano Company was manufacturing ten to twelve finished units a day.

1920s 
The company reached a peak monthly production volume in November 1922, surpassing its previous monthly high in March 1920. It has been estimated that, of the some 360,000 pianos produced in America in 1909, 56% were players.

In 1925, construction began on the fifth and largest addition to the original Straube factory. The architect was J.T. Hutton & Son, the son being William Sturgeon Hutton (1890–1975). The structure was four stories with a basement. The new addition was devoted largely to the manufacturer of grand and re-producing grand pianos.

In June 1925, Straube moved into the new plant. The new plant added 70,000 square feet of manufacturing space and provided a suite of new executive offices. The total floor-space, including the addition, was about a hundred and sixty thousand square feet. The new space was especially designed for a new unit that could produce 2,500 Straube grands a year to meet demand. William G. Betz – Straube's plant superintendent since 1917, piano design engineer, and inventor who was highly regarded by the industry – had spent several years perfecting the construction and design of the new Straube grands. Straube also hired William David McIlwrath (né McIlwraith; 1872–1931), a veteran piano factory superintendent and piano engineer with years of experience in the production of grands, to take charge a department in the new unit. McIlwrath had been the manufacturing superintendent of Jesse French & Sons Piano Co. of New Castle, Indiana, since February 16, 1920, and had been employed there since 1913. McIlwrath learned the profession in Canada, having been associated with many of the leading factories in the East.

In 1929, Straube began producing radios.

Sales of pianos and player pianos, industry-wide, began to slip in the early 1920s, due partly to the rising popularity of radio as an alternative for home entertainment and due partly to the rising popularity of automobiles, which cost about the same as premium Straube pianos ($325). And, like pianos, automobiles were commonly purchased on installment. In 1925, 80% of pianos sold by the retail trade were done so on installment plans. After the Wall Street Crash of 1929 and into the Great Depression, sales declined further and Straube began to struggle financially.

1930s 
In 1930, Straube was using the advertising firm of Lamport, Fox & Co., Irvin Sylvester Dolk (1891–1981), ad executive of South Bend, Indiana.

Struggling to survive, the Straube Piano Company sold its Hammond factory in 1931 to the J.L. Metz Furniture Co. for $125,000 and leased back a large portion of the building. In May 1934, the Straube Piano Company went into a friendly receivership. Roy Francis McPharlin (1893–1980) was appointed as receiver. On January 4, 1935, McPharlin distributed a "first and final" dividend of 8/10 of 1 cent of one dollar (i.e., 86¢ for $100) to the creditors. During the summer of 1935, the company reorganized. By then, it was still producing pianos, but occupied only a portion of the factory it once owned. The remainder of the plant was occupied by J.L. Metz Furniture Co. In 1935, the Straube Piano Company was being operated by the Fidelity Security Company, John Leonard Keilman (1867–1946), president. Fidelity Security was the finance arm of Straube Piano – dealing in piano paper and other securities.

When Straube went into receivership, all of its officers departed, including president Jacobson, president; C.H.J. Thorby, vice-president; and Alfred Theodore Schuldes (1892–1981), secretary-treasurer. Also, in 1935, William G. Betz (1871–1957), longtime superintendent with over 50 patents, left the company. In the interim, after the departure of Betz and before the appointment of Charles Henry Bartolomee as plant superintendent, Alvin Detloff Meyer (1879–1970), a Straube purchasing agent and longtime employee, took charge of manufacturing.

Around June 1936, Straube Piano Company moved its offices from the First Trust Building in Hammond to the Straube factory at 5049 Columbia Avenue in Hammond.  And its board of directors elected Lemuel (Lem) Kline (1868–1945) as secretary-treasurer.

On January 19, 1937, the Straube Piano Company was adjudicated bankrupt in United States District Court for the Northern District of Indiana, Hammond Division. In March 1937, the receiver for the Straube Piano Company sold all remaining assets for $4,655 to individuals who planned to continue the business. The dividend amount is not known. The assets consisted of the name and goodwill of the business, unfinished pianos – about twenty in process of construction – thirty piano cases unassembled, and various supplies of finished and unfinished materials and parts used in the construction of pianos, along with piano strings and wire and other parts for piano manufacturing.

Reorganization 
A new company was formed in Indiana on March 27, 1937, as Straube Pianos Inc. located at 5049 Columbia Avenue and production of Straube pianos resumed in the leased portion of the Hammond factory that the former company once owned. The 1937 executives were:
 Walter Ernst Schrage (1912–1982), president, whose father, William Ernst Schrage (1884–1941), was president of the Bank of Whiting, Hammond, Indiana
 Max B. Pattiz (1890–1979), vice-president and general manager (former president of Lauter Piano Company, maker of the Lauter-Humana player piano, Newark, New Jersey)
 Harry E. Powers (1899–1954), secretary and treasurer; Powers was a lawyer from nearby Whiting, Indiana

1940s 
On May 1, 1940, Straube Pianos Inc. moved to Chicago Heights to occupy 48,000 sq. ft. of a warehouse owned by National Tea. The executives of the company were:
 Walter Ernst Schrage, Jr., president
 Charles Henry Bartholomee (1874–1960), who began as superintendent in 1935 and became Vice President of Straube Pianos Inc. in July 1940
 Penfield Emory Mason (1875–1963), sales manager (sales manager many years with the Haddorff Co.)
 Charles Roy Arnold (born 1900), Atlanta manager (later, president) of Continental Music Inc., a division of C.G. Conn

In 1941, the executives were:
 Charles Henry Bartholomee, vice president Straube Pianos Inc.
 Herbert A. Koehlinger (1902–1955), vice president and New York manager (Eastern Manager of the Continental Music Co.); Koehlinger later was sales manager of the Fred Gretsch Manufacturing Company 
 Paul M. Gazlay (1896–1966), president of Continental Music Inc.; Gazlay was president of C.G. Conn from 1949 to 1958

In October 1941, C.G. Conn acquired Straube Pianos Inc. For the previous two years, Continental Music Co. of Chicago – a subsidiary of Conn – had been the sales representative for Straube, with P. E. Mason as sales manager. Mason, in the mid-1920s, had been vice president of the Cable-Nelson Piano Company before it had merged with the Everett Piano Company in 1926. C.G. Conn extended the relationship with Continental and kept Bartholomee as the head of manufacturing. Mason, who for many years had been the sales manager for the Haddorff Piano Co., Rockford, Illinois, joined Continental when C.G. Conn acquired Haddorff in November 1940.

Sometime before May 12, 1942, the U.S. War Production Board restricted piano production by C.G. Conn, Ltd., to 120 pianos a month. On May 12, 1942, C.G. Conn, Ltd., announced that it would consolidate its piano manufacturing by moving its Straube manufacturing from Chicago Heights to its Haddorff Piano manufacturing plant in Rockford, Illinois, at Railroad Avenue and 9th Street—a leased facility that Haddorff shared with the Rockford Chair and Furniture Company. Haddorff had sold its original Rockford plant on Harrison Avenue in 1940. In December 1940, a month after C.G. Conn's acquisition of the Haddorff Piano Company, Conn moved the Haddorff's manufacturing operations into the Railroad Avenue plant, which it had modernized.

On May 30, 1942 – a few weeks after C.G. Conn consolidated the manufacturing of Haddorff and Straube pianos at the Haddorff plant in Rockford – the War Production Board (WPB) ordered that manufacturing of pianos at the Rockford plant cease by July 31, 1942. Under a war contract between C.G. Conn, Ltd., and the U.S. War Department, the Rockford plant produced parts for gliders and trainer planes from 1942 to 1946.

The last published reference to the sale of a Straube piano was in July 1946, when the Haddorff Piano Co. of Rockford, Illinois, exhibited a complete line of Haddorff and Straube grands and spinets at the Palmer House in Chicago during the Convention of the National Association of Music Merchants. Production of Straube pianos ceased in 1949.

C.G. Conn retained ownership of Straube Pianos Inc. until 1969, when C.G. Conn was acquired by the Crowell-Collier MacMillan Company. The assets of Straube Piano Inc. included those acquired from the March 1937 receivers sale of the former Straube Piano Company. The Indiana corporate charters of (i) Straube Pianos Inc. (incorporated March 25, 1937), (ii) Straube Piano Company Inc. (incorporated November 14, 1941), and (iii) Struabe Piano and Music Company (incorporated October 24, 1922) expired January 1, 1970.

Straube Piano & Music Company 
The Straube Piano & Music Company was the retail division and subsidiary of the Straube Piano Company.  It was launched around 1920.  Also, in 1920, the retail division purchased a two-story building on S Hohman Street in Hammond, Indiana for $75,000. The building housed four stores and six office suites yielding rental income of about $9,000 a year. The building was made of brick and terra cotta and had frontage of 100 feet on South Hohman Street. The directors of Straube Piano Company incorporated its retail division in 1922.

Brands and models

Straube brands
 Straube
 Hammond – Hammond pianos and players were an outgrowth of the Hammond Piano Co., organized in Hammond, Indiana, in 1904, by James F. Broderick. The Straube Piano Company held a controlling interest in the company. The objective was to produce medium grade pianos, with comparable quality, at lower prices than the premium Straubes. The Hammond Piano Co. launched its first two pianos in 1905, Style 21 and Style 23, both full uprights. Hammond pianos were made in the same factory as Straube and Gilmore pianos, but the Hammond Piano Co. business was kept separate. The Hammond Piano Co. was originally chartered in 1903 Illinois as the Chicago Electric Piano Co. by the Straube Piano Company. The incorporators were James T. Broderick, E. R. Jacobson and W. G. Martin, all of the Straube Piano Co. The purpose was to market a nickel-in-the-slot piano player known in the East as the Autoelectra. The name-change to Hammond Piano Co. was filed in Indiana in February 1905.
 Gilmore – Gilmore pianos began production in 1904 as a private label for a retail customer in Philadelphia, the customer being Gustave Herzberg (1835–1924), father of Edward Herzberg (1870–1931), who ran the piano department at the Snellenburg Store. Edward left Straube as vice president in 1904 to join his father. The Gilmore line ran until about 1927. Earliest reference to a Gilmore Piano is 1900
 Woodward – manufactured after 1910

Straube models 
Straube models and prices (f.o.b.) Hammond

 Grands
 The Conservatory – (1926 – $950)
 The Artist – (1926 – $795)
 The Italian (1926)
 The Sonata Florentine (1926)
 Reproducing
 Model C – (1926 – $2,575, and up) – "An instrument which recreates with absolute fidelity the playing of the world's master pianists, a combination of the superb Straube Conservatory model grand with the famous Welte Mignon (Licensee) reproducing action. Its amazing range of expression imparts a realism which makes it impossible to distinguish the reproduction from the personal playing of the artist. A library of more than 4,000 rolls puts the world's greatest music at the disposal of the owner of a Straube Model C. R."
 Players
 Style A (introduced in 1912) – Louis XV casing
 Style B (introduced in 1917 or prior)
 Style E
 Style 15 (introduced in 1917 or prior)
 Style T (introduced in 1922 or prior) – with Artronome Player Action
 The Arcadian – (1926 – $750)
 The Imperial – (1926 – $675)
 The Colonial – (1926 – $625)
 The Puritan – (1926 – $595)
 The Dominion – (1926 – $550)
 Style 20 (1914)
 Uprights
 (1926 – $395, $425, $525)
 Style J – Cabinet Grand (introduced in 1901 or prior)
 Style K – Cabinet Grand (introduced in 1901 or prior)
 Style L – Cabinet Grand (introduced in 1898)
 Style M – Cabinet Grand (introduced in 1898)
 Style B – Cabinet Grand (introduced in 1906) – "Elegant double veneered case, in fancy mahogany, Italian walnut, American burl walnut or oak; heavily cross banded with y8-inch stock; all carving hand work; all moldings cross veneered; hand carved trusses of natural woods; new cabinet grand scale with Capo 'dAstro bearing bar in bass section; patent improved double repeating action with brass capstan regulating screws in keys; improved double roll fall board; nickel-plated hammer rail and continuous hinges; ivory keys, noiseless pedals; nickel-plated tuning pins, fully bushed, copper wrapped bass strings. The inside of this case is lined throughout with bird's-eye maple, finished in keeping with the balance of the instrument. Dimensions: 7 1-3 octaves; height, 4 feet 8 inches; with, 5 feet 3 inches; depth, 2 feet 4 inches.
 Style C (introduced in 1905 or prior)
 Style I (introduced in 1905 or prior)
 Style D (1914)
 Style O (introduced 1912) – double veneered case, with full extension music desk, new grand scale with capo D'Astro bearing bar on bass section, nickel plated tuning pins, brass strings wrapped with copper, patent improved double repeating action with brass capstan regulating screws in keys, bushed tuning pins, nickel plated hammer rail, continuous hinges, improved double roll fall board, ivory keys and patent noiseless pedals. It is 4 feet 8 inches in height
 Style S – similar to the Style O
 Style F (introduced on or before 1925)
 Style G (introduced on or before 1925)
 Style H (introduced on or before 1925)

Hammond models 

 Players
 Hammond Style 10 (1914), made of mahogany & oak
 The Artronome player action, introduced on Straube player pianos in May 1921, included patented pendulum valves, one for each note, a tenpoint customized motor, and an automatic ball-bearing roll adjuster for the tracking.

 The valve, according to the company, became the heart of the Artronome action. According to Straube literature, it was frictionless, non-corrosive, and eliminated 90 percent of all player problems caused by friction and corrosion in the mechanism. By 1922, over one million Straube pendulum valves had been installed in player pianos of various makes.
 The valves were three-tier and horizontal, but not the more common type found in horizontal valve actions, which were usually the wire i-pin variety. Each valve pivoted between two ears that extended from each metal plate.
 Each valve was a wood disc with leather facing on both sides. One face had a center hole leading to a pocket of a larger diameter in the wood. The valve was supported only by a lever between the valve plate pivot and the pouch lifter disc, with a right angle dowel extension that "plugged in" the center hole of the valve button. The pivotal lever is easily removable because it was not cemented to the valve, rendering a loose valve button in the valve well behind the valve plate that was screwed onto the valve chest with white sealing compound.
 The Straube Style L was a short upright – only 3 ft 7 inches tall, introduced in 1926 – that incorporated Straube's patented Duplex Overstringing. Straube claimed that the Duplex Overstringing enabled the piano to produce the sound of a full upright.
 The Melo-Harp was a patented pneumatic-controlled attachment for Straube pianos.
 The Straube Grands offered in 1927 included lengths four-foot-four, five-foot-two, six-foot, and six-foot-two in various styles.
 Straube Reproducing Grands were automated player pianos that used a Welte-Mignon action manufactured under license by the Auto Pneumatic Action Co. of Manhattan, New York.

In 1924, Straube introduced individual names for its players rather than alpha letters in an effort to stimulate retail sales. A year earlier, Straube introduced a uniform national pricing policy. In 1923, Straube also launched a national advertising campaign.

Explanation of the term Studio Grand: A tall upright piano – 50 inches or taller, one that a person of average height can't see over when seated at the bench – is sometimes referred to as an "upright grand". Straube branded it as a "Cabinet Grand". Use of the word "grand" with uprights should not be confused with concert grands. Upright grands can be of high quality and – short of concert grands – are often the choice of serious pianists, recording studios, and performance venues. A mid-high upright – one that one can barely see over – is often used in dance studios, where an accompanist can see the dancers. A short upright, one that rises less than a foot above the keyboard, is referred to as a spinet. Serious pianists typically regard spinets as inadequate because the soundboard is too short to produce a full sound with full overtones.

Sample Straube serial numbers 
 Straube serial numbers run from 1895 to 1949

 SN: 6692 (1896–1897) – upright
 SN: 7370 (1898) – upright
 SN: 7371 (1898) – upright (engraved wood casing)
 SN: 7381 (1898) – upright (exported to Liverpool, England)
 SN: 8311 (1898–1899) – Gabriel W, grand
 SN: 9058 (1900) – upright
 SN: 9547 (1901) – upright
 SN: 9577 (1901) – upright
 SN: 9788 (1901) – upright
 SN: 10028 (1901) – upright
 SN: 10606 (1902) – upright
 SN: 11271 (1903) – upright
 SN: 11428 (1904) – upright
 SN: 11552 (1905) – Cabinet Grand (upright) ("Est 1878")
 SN: 13962 (1907) – upright
 SN: 13992 (1907) – baby grand
 SN: 18629 (1912)
 SN: 19051 (1912) – upright ("double repeating action")
 SN: 19373 (1912) – upright
 SN: 19382 (1912) - Upright
 SN: 23588 (1915)
 SN: 26145 (1916) – upright
 SN: 23588 (or 45756) (1919) – Melo-Harp, full upright
 SN: 25077 (1916) – Cabinet Grand (upright)
 SN: 28336 (1917) – player
 SN: 29582 (1918) – Upright Grand
 SN: 33346 (1919) – upright
 SN: 34619 (1920) – upright
 SN: 37784 (1921) - player - w/French Repeating Action. Manufactured for the Wm.H.Elsinger stores in St. Paul Minnesota.
 SN: 38173 (1921) – player 
 SN: 39876 (1922) – upright
 SN: 41441 (1923) – upright
 SN: 41953 (1923) – baby grand
 SN: 44412 (1923) – player
 SN: 45813 (1924) – player
 SN: 46026 (1924) – player 
 SN: 47555 (1925) – upright
 SN: 47715 (1925) – player
 Patented vertical Grand French Repeating Action Piano"
 "new improved"
 "scale with patent double repeating"
 SN: 49041 (1925) – upright 
 SN: 49339 (1925) – upright
 SN: 50066 (1925) – baby grand
 SN: 50224 (1925) – upright
 SN: 50839 (1925) – full upright
 SN: 53477 (1926) – player, French Repeating Action
 SN: 54624 (1927) – player
 SN: 54873 (1927) – upright 
 SN: 55030 (1927) – baby grand
 SN: 55857 (1927) – upright (National Piano Manufactures Assc. Certicificate #858800)
 SN: 56002 (1928) – grand
 SN: 57098 (1928) – Sonata, baby grand 
 SN: 57447 (1928) – player, style H, ID 58558
 SN: 59314 (1938) – upright
 SN: 59384 (1929) – Vertical Grand French Repeating Action
 SN: 59577 (1930) – Vertical Grand French Repeating Action ("Est 1878") ("CW Lindsay, Montreal, Quebec, Canada)
 SN: 60001 (1931) – upright
 SN: 61593 (1938)
 SN: 61953 (1938) – spinet, 38' x 59' x 23
 SN: 62937 (1939) – spinet
 SN: 63593 (1941) – upright
 SN: 63703 (1941) – upright
 SN: 64165 (1941) – upright
 SN: 64232 (1941) – spinet
 SN: 64396 (1941) – spinet
 SN: 65065 (1949) – upright
 SN: 66090 (1949) – Sonata, baby grand

National Music Museum No. 14434. Upright piano with player mechanism (Hammond Melo-Harp) by the Straube Co., Hammond, Indiana, manufactured 1916, serial no. 26494. AAA-c5 (7+ octaves). Three pedals: half blow, "Melo-Harp" (tabs with staples for a jarring, "honky-tonk" tone), dampers. Purchased by Perry Fulton Pinkerton (1873–1952) for his wife, Isadora Edna (née Rouff; 1876–1923), in 1918. Delivered by train and wagon to the family farmhouse in Quimby, Iowa, where it remained until coming to the NMM, this player piano filled family events with music and provided accompaniment for dancing. Gift of Edward and James Pinkerton, grandsons, in memory of their parents, Ross Cavanaugh Pinkerton (1913–2009) and Arlene Jane (née Bugh; 1919–2009) late of Quimby, Iowa.

 Woodward

 SN: 16170 (1910) – upright
 SN: 16298 (1910) – upright
 SN: 21937 (1914) – Cabinet Grand (upright)
 SN: 22883 (1915) – Cabinet Grand (upright)
 SN: 26096 (1916) – upright
 SN: 35355 (1920) – player
 SN: 36715 (1921) – upright
 SN: 41441 (1923) – player
 SN: 57908 (1929) – upright 

 Hammond

 SN: 8743 (1900) – upright
 SN: 15972 (1909) – Cabinet Grand (upright)
 SN: 17868 (1911) – upright
 SN: 20401 (1913) – Cabinet Grand (upright)
 SN: 22759 (1915) – upright player
 SN: 23414 (1915) – upright
 SN: 23707 (1915) – Cabinet Grand (upright)
 SN: 24488 (1915) – Cabinet Grand (upright) (price in gold lettering $650)
 SN: 25340 (1916) – Cabinet Grand (upright)
 SN: 27297 (1917) – full upright
 SN: 28895 (1917) – Cabinet Grand (upright)
 SN: 29761 (1918) – Cabinet Grand (upright)
 SN: 41297 (1923) – upright
 SN: 43381 (1923) – upright player Melo-Harp with Artronome player action
 SN: 43908 (1923) – upright (vertical grand French repeating action)
 SN: 44689 (1924) – upright player
 SN: 49853 (1925) – upright player
 SN: 58809 (1946) – upright (vertical grand French repeating action, about 52" high)

 Playtona mfg by Straube for Grinnell Brothers

 SN: 49381 (1953) – 1953

 Straube Piano Company & Straube Pianos Inc. serial numbers

 1895: 6500
 1900: 8700
 1901: 9400
 1902: 10300
 1903: 10900
 1904: 11400
 1905: 11900
 1906: 12600
 1907: 13500
 1908: 14300
 1909: 15100
 1910: 16000
 1911: 17200
 1912: 18400
 1913: 19600
 1914: 21000
 1915: 22500
 1916: 24500
 1917: 27000
 1918: 29500
 1919: 31700
 1920: 34000
 1921: 36900
 1922: 38400
 1923: 41200
 1924: 44600 
 1925: 47000
 1926: 51000
 1927: 54000
 1928: 56000
 1929: 57800
 1930: 59400
 1931: 59995
 (no data for 1932–35)
 1936: 60000
 1937: 60500
 1938: 61000
 1939: 62000
 1940: 62500
 1941: 63500
 1942: 64500
 1949: 65021

Notes: In 1954, the Hammond Organ Co. acquired the Everett and Cable Nelson names and also started building Hammond pianos. These Hammond Pianos are of no relation to those once produced by Straube. Hammond pianos were discontinued around 1965.

Selected owners, executives, and managers 

 James Francis Broderick
James (Jim) Francis Broderick (19 August 1854 Philadelphia – 17 November 1920 Chicago) became president on January 1, 1898, and served in that role until March 1911. Before joining Straube Piano, Broderick had been a traveling salesman for Steger & Company and the B. Shoninger Co.

 Ernfrid Reinholdt Jacobson
E.R. Jacobson was the son of Charles Frithiof Jacobson (1852–1906), and Helena (née Nicholson; 1845–1910). Ernfrid Jacobson, with his parents, immigrated to the United States in 1882 and settled in Chicago. Jacobson received his public school education in Chicago. He began his career as an office boy, then a bookkeeper and general office utility man for various concerns until August 1898.

In addition to being president part owner with his brothers of Straube Piano Company and Straube Piano & Music Co., which operated several music stores; E.R. Jacobson also was president of the Fidelity Security Co., dealers in piano paper and other securities, and treasurer of the Hammond Machine and Forge Works.

Politically, E.R. Jacobson was a Republican. He was a member of the Bethlehem Swedish Lutheran Church of Englewood, Illinois, where he had been a trustee since 1898, and was also the treasurer of the church. He resided at 5754 Fifth avenue.

 William Straube
William Straube, before 1894, had been president of the Schaeffer Piano Company, which in 1896, had a sales room on the second floor of 236 Wabash Avenue, Chicago.

After Straube sold his interest in the Straube Piano Company in 1901, he focused on his real estate development business in Downers Grove, Illinois. In 1902, Straube became a director of the Cerro Mojarra Plantation Company, a ranching and agricultural firm operating in Oaxaca, Mexico.

The Schaeffer Piano Company, founded by William Schaeffer (1832–1888) in Württemberg, Germany, around 1872, was established in New York in 1877.  Schaeffer had factories at 472 West 43rd Street, and 456 West 37th Street, Manhattan, New York. Then, in 1889, after Schaeffer's death, the company was established in Illinois and incorporated on December 31, 1891, in Illinois, by Charles M. Herman, Isaac Newton Rice (1847–1929), and Samuel Ringgold Huyett (1946–1911).

In 1892, the Schaeffer's piano factory, located in Oregon, Illinois, had 90 employees and was producing 20 pianos a week.

In the fall of 1894, Scheaffer Piano Co. (William Straube, president), moved its manufacturing operations from Oregon, Illinois, to River View – on the Wisconsin Railway, two miles from the Chicago city limit. The new facility had twice the floor space.

Under financial duress in 1896, the assets of Schaeffer Piano were assigned its assets to the creditor, Floyd E. Jennison (1857–1920), in the Cook County Court. The goodwill and patents were sold to Thomas Edwin Dougherty who, in 1895, re-established and re-incorporated the company as Schaeffer Piano Manufacturing Company.

In 1902, while Thomas Edwin Dougherty (1856–1943) was president, the Schaeffer Piano Company manufacturing plant in River View had a fire. The company subsequently erected a new plant in Kankakee, Illinois.

In 1891, William Straube went into partnership with Alfred Roland Heckman (1859–1914), a brother of his wife, Jessica Fremont Heckman (1857–1944), both of 8 Heckman siblings. Their firm, Heckman & Straube, sold land lots in Downers Grove beginning 1891.

 Martin Straube
The 1910 Census shows Martin living in Oregon, Illinois, perhaps working for the Schiller Piano Company sometime before 1910. In 1940, he was living in Los Angeles, still working in the piano business.

 James Frithiof Jacobson
James (Jimmy) Frithiof Jacobson (5 February 1885 Chicago – December 1968 Hammond, Indiana) attended public schools in Chicago. After leaving school worked in a warehouse for two years, then spent eight years with the Crerar-Adams Company, a railway supply firm. Following that, he and his brother, Ernfrid Reinholdt Jacobson, became associated in a music store at Indiana Harbor.

 Others
Clinton Wilson Howe (born 1875), bookkeeper at Straube Piano from 1895 to 1897

Directors and executives 

 January 4, 1901: Straube Piano Company
 James F. Broderick, president
 Edward Herzberg, vice-president,
 E.R. Jacobson, secretary

 1902: Straube Piano Company
 24 Adams Street, Chicago
 E.R. Jacobson, Secretary & Director
 William Straube, Manager & Director
 James F. Broderick, Secretary, Treasurer, Director
 Edward Herzberg (born 1859), Vice-President & Director; he left Straube in 1904 to join his brother Harry and father Gustave in Philadelphia to run the piano department of the Snellenburg Store.

 1905: Straube Piano Company
 24-26 Adams Street, Chicago (Stevens Building)
 James F. Broderick, President, Treasurer, Manager and Director 
 Mary D. Broderick (1862–1932), Vice-President and Director (wife of James F. Broderick)
 Edward Herzberg (43), Vice-President and Director
 Ernfrid Reinholdt Jacobson, 43, Secretary and Director
 William Straube, President, Manager and Director

 April 1905
 James F. Broderick, president
 William P. Parker (1843–1907), vice president
 Ernfrid Reinholdt Jacobson, secretary
 James Frithiof Jacobson (born 1885), secretary

Superintendents and foremen 

 1906–19??: Gunnar G. Lindstrom (1870–1949), became superintendent in 1906. He became the superintendent at the Haddorff Piano Company and in 1923, moved into sales at Haddorff
 1917–1935: William G. Betz (1871–1957), superintendent from 1917 to 1935, (over 50 patents), left the company in 1935. After leaving Straube, Betz patented several piano action mechanisms and assigned them to Pratt Read and Company Inc., maker of piano mechanisms.
 1935–1942: Charles Henry Bartholomee (1874–1960) began as superintendent and was superintendent in July 1940; in 1940, Bartholomee became Vice President of Straube Pianos Inc. Before joining Straube, he had been superintendent of the Smith Barnes Piano Factory for several years and superintendent of the P.A. Starck Piano Co., Chicago, also for several years.
 1925–1930: William David McIlwrath (1872–1931), foreman, under Bartholomee's direction, of the manufacturer of Straube Grands
 1942–1949: Carl Leopold Haddorff (1895–1952), son of Charles A. Haddorff (1864–1928), co-founder of the Haddorff Piano Company
 Roy Hilmer Olsen (1888–1965), in 1920, was a foreman for Straube; in 1930 he was a clerk for a candy manufacturer in Chicago; and in 1942 he was working for Carnegie-Illinois Steel Company. His father, John Olsen, a Norwegian immigrant, was a piano maker.

Wholesale and retail sales 

 Charles W. Smith (1861–1932), appointed manager in 1920 of Straube's retail division
 Alfred Theodore Schuldes (1892–1981)
 1923–1926: James Randolph Adams (1898–1956), 1960 posthumous inductee into the American Advertising Federation Hall of Fame Adams credited his success to his first job, which was with Straube as advertising and sales promotion manager.
 William S. Robertson (1860–1924), joined Straube around 1913 and was its Eastern representative until he suffered a stroke in October 1923
 W.J. Robertson (born approx 1898), nephew of William S. Robertson, joined Straube at the end of 1920
 James Newton England (1882–1956), Atlanta sales representative
 Roy Solomon Dunn (1877–1932), joined Straube at the end of 1920; on January 1, 1927, Dunn became Western sales manager of Brinkerhoff Piano Co. of Chicago; Dunn became the Western sales manager for Splitdorf Radio Corp. in January 1928, the year that Thomas A. Edison, Inc., acquired the firm
 James Alfred Terry (born 1889) – After working with Straube, Terry co-founded the James A. Terry Piano Co. in 1913 in Duluth, Minnesota, operating as a piano retailer under the name of Terry-Gulliuson Piano Co.
 Leroy Jovst Viersin, Sr. (1878–1959)
 J. Roy Huckins, traveling salesman – central and northwestern wholesale representative from 1922 to 1926
 Henry Anthony Erikson (1884–1949) – salesman, Straube Music Store
 Armon C. Harper (born 1894) – salesman, Straube Piano Company
 Oscar Andrew Lindholm (1884–1932) – piano salesman, Staube Music Store
 George Burl Simpson (1887–1954), based out of Chillicothe, Missouri, started May 1921 as a traveling salesman for Straube, covering Missouri and Eastern Kansas
 Hugh Alexander Stewart (1890–1963), began as a sales, advertising, and promotion manager in September 1927 In 1936, Stewart was sales manager for Rudolph Wurlitzer Company, and in 1938 he ascended to vice president. He retired from Wurlitzer in 1958.
 David Lord Sterling (1882–1949), formerly a traveling salesman for Poole Piano Co. of Boston
 R.A. Rasmusson
 William H. Rasmusson (born 1883)
 Charles A. Clinton (1902–1986), sales manager at Straube from about 1939 to 1942
 Lemuel (Lem) Kline (1868–1945), general sales manager beginning around 1936
 Robert Edward Lauer (born 1891) joined Straube's traveling sales force in 1927 to cover Ohio and West Virginia.
 "In the retail piano business today, conditions have changed materially from what they were a few years ago. Instead of simply considering old names and traditions as an asset, we are now obliged to treat with modern forms of merchandising, both buying and selling. We have to think in terms of dollars and cents and it is from this angle that the Straube line is particularly interesting. Any merchant who adopts the Straube system of retail piano business operation is bound to make money with it."
 Joseph Edward Albineau (1886–1961) became general representative for Straube in 1927, covering Wisconsin, Minnesota, North Dakota, and South Dakota.
 W.E. Gillespie, was a traveling representative in Missouri and Illinois for Straube from before 1915 to 1927, when he moved on to become special representative for W.W. Kimball Co. In 1931, based in Seattle, Gillespie was representative for Starr Piano. In 1934, he was a representative for Haddorff.
 C.E. West
 Simien Myers Wessel (1873–1947) had been the treasurer for R.K. Maynard Co. until about 1912, when the company went bankrupt. He then founded a piano company that produced pianos bearing his name, "S.M. Wessel".  By 1915, Wessel was a wholesale rep for Straube.

Others

 Alvin Detloff Meyer (1879–1970), a Straube purchasing agent and longtime employee who served as an interim superintendent in 1935 after its first reorganization and subsequent departure of William G. Betz, was, in 1928, instrumental in developing a more sustainable solution for fastening legs to the cases of Straube Grands. Blackhawk Foundry & Machine Co. of Davenport, Iowa, designed more sturdy plates in response to a design request letter that Meyer had sent to several manufacturers. Straube Piano announced the innovation to its competitors and by the end of 1928, Blackhawk was making the plates for 13 of the largest piano manufacturers in the country.

Addresses

Retail sales 
 1898–19??: 24-26 East Adams Street, Chicago
 1911: 59 Adams Street, Chicago
 1915: 209 South State Street, Chicago
 190?–1922 (and longer?): 631 Hohman Street, Hammond
 5247 Hohman Avenue, Hammond

Factory: 252 Wildwood Road 
 205 Manila Avenue at Havanna Street, Hammond, Indiana (Manila Avenue was renamed Wildwood Road in 1930)
 Frontage is at 252 Wildwood Rd., service entrance on Kenwood St. (parallel to Wildwood), property is bounded on the north by Wildwood, east by Monon Trail, the south by Kenwood. The property is an L-shape, turn counterclockwise 90 degrees – the most northern border is bounded by Conkey Street. On Kenwood, across the street, is the Oak Hill Cemetery.
 Factory: Wildwood
 1913: Showroom at 59 East Adams Street, Chicago
 1919: Straube purchased a 2-story brick and terracotta building on South Hohman Street, where the firm had been located for years.

Straube photo archives 
 "Cutting up" – President Rick Ricketson, Al Young (Peerless Printing), Duke Melody (pianist); (1955);

Videos

Other Straube names in music not related to Straube Piano 
 J. Straube & Co., Berlin
Straube Piano Company was not related to J. Straube & Co., in Berlin, an organ maker founded in 1869 that endured until 1972. In 1903, its founding owners were Johannes Straube (1843–1906) & Karl Straube (1873–1950), father and son. Johannes, an organist, was the superintendent. Johannes was also the son of J.C.F. Straube, a violin maker. In 1923, Otto Pappe (1882–1972) became the owner. Otto's son, Reinhard Pappe (1908–1972), succeeded him as owner until his death in 1972, when the firm was dissolved. William Straube (de), the German painter, was also a son of Johannes. None of the Straubes from this family were directly related to William Straube of the Straube Piano Co.

 William J. Straub, organ builder
William J. Straub (1859–1946), who is listed in the 1901, 1902, and 1904 Syracuse City Directories, was an organ builder. This Straub is unrelated.

 Alois Straub, organ builder
Alois Straub (1826 Baden, Germany – 1883) was a manufacturer of reed organs. He learned cabinet making and worked with the manufacturing of musical instruments in Germany before emigrating to the United States in 1849. Straub settled in Akron, Ohio, and, from about 1852 to 1856, made organs for H.B. Horton (Henry Bishop Horton; 1819–1885). Straub then worked as a traveling salesman for Horton & Rose (Ira Rose; 1820–1891) from 1857 to 1861. Straub opened Akron's first music store 1861 at 148 (later 163) S. Howard Street. Straub was a manufacturer of reed organs under his own name from about 1870 to 1875.

Affiliations 
 National Piano Travelers Association, E.R. Jacobson, et al.
 National Piano Manufacturers Association, Straube Piano Co.
 E.R. Jacobson, past president
 Hammond Manufacturers Association
 E.R. Jacobson, elected president 1925
 Chicago Piano & Organ Association

Selected patents 
In the mid 1920s, Straube Piano had some patents that influenced the industry. In 1926, Straube introduced its patented Duplex Overstringing system – US Patent No. 1769284 – claiming that it enabled smaller Straube uprights to produce the sound of full uprights and Straube's smallest grand, the Sonata Grand, to produce the sound of a full concert grand. The Straube Artronome player piano had many patented innovations, including one that improved pumping power from the foot pedals.

 Roy Hilmer Olsen:

 Patents
 1916: US 1205561 A – "Tone Modulating Device"

 Assignments to Straube
 1916: US 1205561 A – assigned to Straube Piano Company
 William G. Betz during his tenure with Steger & Sons Piano Manufacturing Company:

 Patents
 1907: US 867002 A – "Piano" (strengthening how an agraffe is mounted)
 1911: US 1024174 A – "Tracking Device for Pneumatic Action"
 1911: US 1037584 A – "Hammer-Rail Construction for Pneumatic Pianos"
 1912: US 1023613 A – "Pneumatic Action"
 1912: US 1021502 A – "Pneumatic Action"
 1912: US 1048486 A – "Pneumatic Action"
 1914: US 1197596 A – "Pneumatic Action for Pianos"
 1916: US 1174807 A – "Pneumatic Action"

 Assignments to Steger & Sons
 1911: US 1037584 A – assigned to Seger & Sons
 1911: US 1024174 A – assigned to Seger & Sons
 1912: US 1023613 A – assigned to Seger & Sons
 1912: US 1021502 A – assigned to Seger & Sons
 1912: US 1048486 A – assigned to Seger & Sons

 William G. Betz during his tenure with Straube Piano:
 Patents
 1914: US 1335476 A – "Pneumatic Action for Pianos"
 1917: US 1344574 A – "Music-Roll-Controlling-Mechanism"
 1918: US 1389290 A – "Piano Action"
 1921: US 1444364 A – "Automatic Music-Roll Carrier and Centering Device for Pneumatic Musical Instruments"
 1922: US 1574863 A – "String Plate for Grands Pianos"
 1925: US 1686726 A – "Grand Piano" (frame construction)
 1926: US 1174807 A – "String Plate" (string mounting construction)

 Assignments to Straube
 1920: US 1335476 A – assigned to Straube Piano Company
 1920: US 1344574 A – assigned to Straube Piano Company
 1921: US 1389290 A – assigned to Straube Piano Company
 1921: US 1444364 A – assigned to Straube Piano Company
 1922: US 1574863 A – assigned to Straube Piano Company

References 
 Notes

 Patents
Official Gazette of the United States Patent Office:

 Citations
Music Trade Review (digital access courtesy of The International Arcade Museum Library, Pasadena, California)

Presto, Presto-Times, and Presto Music Times (digital access courtesy of The International Arcade Museum Library, Pasadena, California); 

 General citations

External links
 Straube factory in 1922, in a collection of the Indiana Historical Society
 Straube player pianos in 1922, in a collection of the Indiana Historical Society

Piano manufacturing companies of the United States
Manufacturing companies based in Indiana
Hammond, Indiana
Manufacturing companies established in 1895
1895 establishments in Illinois
Manufacturing companies based in Chicago
Luxury brands